Orland is an unincorporated community in Swan Township, Vinton County, Ohio, in the United States.

History
Orland had its start in the 1880s when the railroad was extended to that point. A post office was established at Orland in 1881, and remained in operation until 1938.

References

Populated places in Vinton County, Ohio